Çağatay Yılmaz (born 1 January 2000) is a Turkish professional footballer who plays as a forward for Bursaspor.

Professional career
A youth product of Bursaspor, Çağatay signed his first professional contract on 26 March 2018. Çağatay made his professional debut for Bursaspor in a 1-0 Süper Lig loss to Gençlerbirliği S.K. on 18 May 2018.

International career
Çağatay was a prolific goal-scorer and captain of Bursaspor's youth sides, and earned several callups to various Turkish youth national teams.

References

External links
 
 
 

2000 births
People from İnegöl
Living people
Turkish footballers
Turkey youth international footballers
Association football forwards
Bursaspor footballers
Niğde Anadolu FK footballers
Süper Lig players
TFF First League players
TFF Second League players